Berezlogi is a commune in Orhei District, Moldova. It is composed of two villages, Berezlogi and Hîjdieni.

Notable people 
 Boris Movilă (born 1928), writer

References

Communes of Orhei District